Samuel Hopkins House is a historic home located at Miller Place in Suffolk County, New York.  It is a -story frame residence with an earlier -story wing on the east side.  The main portion of the house was built about 1770 and remodeled in the Adam or Federal style in 1816.

It was added to the National Register of Historic Places in 2009.

References

External links
History of Miller Place (Coastal Internet)
Miller Place-Mount Sinai Historical Society

Houses on the National Register of Historic Places in New York (state)
Federal architecture in New York (state)
Houses completed in 1770
Houses in Suffolk County, New York
National Register of Historic Places in Suffolk County, New York
1770 establishments in the Province of New York